Uniontown is a ghost town in Jefferson County, Mississippi, United States.

Established along the Natchez Trace (also called the "Old Natchez Road") in the late 18th century, the settlement is now extinct, though "the main street is still visible running parallel to the trace".

History

William Ferguson, an early settler, acquired land in the area in the late 18th century and established Uniontown.

Uniontown was platted into streets, and a cotton gin manufacturer established there about 1797.  Other businesses included a tannery, public gin, wagon and plow maker, weaver, cabinet maker, boot maker, bull-whip maker, and coonskin cap maker.  The Bethel Presbyterian Church was established in Uniontown in 1804.

Decline
Factors contributing the Uniontown's decline include not being selected as the county seat, and the death of 
William Ferguson in 1801.  By 1810, a traveler noted that "Uniontown is a small village of three or four houses in decay".

References

Former populated places in Jefferson County, Mississippi
Natchez Trace
Ghost towns in Mississippi